The men's 200 metre breaststroke competition of the swimming events at the 1973 World Aquatics Championships took place on September 6.

Records
Prior to the competition, the existing world and championship records were as follows.

The following records were established during the competition:

Results

Heats
31 swimmers participated in 4 heats. Th eight fastest times advanced to the final.

Final
The results of the final are below.

References

Breaststroke 200 metre, men's
World Aquatics Championships